Hugo Simon (born 3 August 1942) is an Olympic medal-winning show jumper who took part in six Olympics between 1972 and 1996 (1980 excepted). Before his first Olympic appearance, he competed for West Germany, but in 1972 became an Austrian citizen.

He won a silver medal at age 49 at the team event at the 1992 Olympics on the horse Apricot D. Four years later, at age 53, he came fourth in the individual event after a jump-off involving seven riders competing for two medals.

He was the first person to win three World Cup titles, at the inaugural 1979 contest (on Gladstone) and also in 1997 and 1998 (both on E.T.). This feat was later matched by Rodrigo Pessoa in 2000 and Meredith Michaels-Beerbaum in 2009.

Simon is a businessman who has always considered show jumping a favorite hobby. He was still competing as of 2011, at age 68. He is regarded as the oldest winner of a show jumping Grand Prix, as he won the Grand Prix of Ebreichsdorf (CSI 2*) in May 2011.

Simon competed at his first Olympics in 1972 riding Lavendel. This followed by numerous Grand Prix's nations cups and another four Olympic Games, with The Freak, Gipsy Lady, Apricot D and E.T. Although Simon has had many successful horses it is with the showjumping great E.T. he is best known, along with E.T. Simon won many grand prix's and championships including the Aachen Grand prix in 1998 as well as the world cup final in 1997.

Amaretto I – Alexis Z x Gotthard (7 May 1982)
Answer – x
Apricot D – Alexis Z x Gotthard (1984)
Caldato – Caretino x Landgraf I (1 May 2007)
Coco Chanel – x
Especiale – Voltaire x Ulft (1 January 1986)
E.T. FRH – Espri x Garibaldi II (21 April 1987)
Explosiv – Espri x (21 May 1992)
Gipsy Lady – Gardestern I x Davos (1 January 1982)
Gladstone – Götz x Weingau (1969)
Gondoso – Gonzales x Landmeister (1986)
Jasper – Courville xx x Nizam (23 March 1968)
Lavendel – Lateran x Welf (1960)
Magnum E – Wörth x Manometer (1982)
Pasoa Dice – x
Sir Piroth – Seydlitz x (1 January 1988)
The Freak – Lucky Boy xx x Banko (1 January 1976)
Ukinda – Emilion x Satanas de Vaux (1997)
Wahre Liebe – Werther x Graphit (1989)
Winzer – x

07 – Dortmund Germany, 1.50 Group comp. (1.50 Group comp.) – Ukinda 15 March 2008
09 – Dortmund Germany, 1.45 Against the clock (1.45 Against the clock) – Caldato 15 March 2008
03 – Dortmund Germany, 1.45 Against the clock (1.45 Against the clock) – Caldato 14 March 2008
05 – Aachen, Stawag-Prize (Stawag-Prize) – Caldato 19 May 2006
05 – Aachen, Baltic Horse Show "Ladies vs. Men" – 1.45 Winning round (Baltic Horse Show "Ladies vs. Men" – 1.45 Winning round) – Caldato 17 May 2006
02 – Linz, Austria, Nations Cup (Nations Cup) – Caldato 14 May 2006
02 – Linz, Austria, Nations Cup (Nations Cup) – Caldato 14 May 2006
03 – Linz, Austria, Preis der Draeger Medical – 1.45 Two phases (Preis der Draeger Medical – 1.45 Two phases) – Caldato 13 May 2006
03 – Linz, Austria, Preis der Draeger Medical – 1.45 Two phases (Preis der Draeger Medical – 1.45 Two phases) – Caldato 13 May 2006
44 – Neumunster Germany, Neumunster Grand Prix (Neumunster Grand Prix) – Caldato 19 February 2006
06 – Neumunster Germany, Grosser Preis der E.ON Sales and Trading GmbH – 1.60 Mixed comp. (Grosser Preis der E.ON Sales and Trading GmbH – 1.60 Mixed comp.) – Pasoa Dice 18 February 2006
09 – Neumunster Germany, Arienheller Premium Cup – 1.60 Against the clock (Arienheller Premium Cup – 1.60 Against the clock) – Caldato 17 February 2006
11 – Frankfurt, Grand Prix (Grand Prix) – Caldato 18 December 2005
07 – Dortmund Germany, 1.45 Speed and handiness (1.45 Speed and handiness) – Coco Chanel 16 March 2002
01 – Berlin, Audi Championat Finale 01 (Audi Championat Finale 01) – ET 24 November 2001
08 – Berlin, Championat Von Berlin (Championat Von Berlin) – Explosiv 23 November 2001
05 – Berlin, Audi Championat Finale 02 (Audi Championat Finale 02) – ET 22 November 2001
01 – Linz, Austria, Grand Prix (Grand Prix) – ET 16 September 2001
17 – Aachen, Grand Prix (Grand Prix) – ET 17 June 2001
05 – Aachen, Prize of Tuchfabrik Becker (Prize of Tuchfabrik Becker) – Explosiv 15 June 2001
01 – Aachen, Prize of ELSA AG (Prize of ELSA AG) – ET 12 June 2001
01 – Aachen, Prize of ELSA AG (Prize of ELSA AG) – ET 12 June 2001
07 – Dortmund Germany, Dortmund Grand Prix (Dortmund Grand Prix) – ET 11 March 2001
18 – Dortmund Germany, World Cup Qualifier (World Cup Qualifier) – ET 10 March 2001
10 – Dortmund Germany, 1.50 Against the clock (1.50 Against the clock) – ET 9 March 2001
07 – Stuttgart, Germany, Stuttgart Grand Prix (Stuttgart Grand Prix) – ET 19 November 2000
07 – Düsseldorf, Germany, Grand Prix (Grand Prix) – ET 15 October 2000
01 – Rotterdam, Netherlands, Rotterdam Grand Prix (Rotterdam Grand Prix) – ET 27 August 2000
02 – Aachen, Masters (Masters) – ET 14 July 2000
06 – Helsinki Finland, Helsinki Grand Prix (Helsinki Grand Prix) – ET 18 June 2000
05 – Zurich, Zurich Grand Prix (Zurich Grand Prix) – ET 18 March 2000
22 – Bordeaux, Prix Paris Turf (Table C) (Prix Paris Turf (Table C) ) – Sir Piroth 13 February 2000
07 – Bordeaux, Grand Prix Montres Pequignet (Grand Prix Montres Pequignet) – ET 13 February 2000
26 – Bordeaux, Prix de la Foire Internationale de Bordeaux (Prix de la Foire Internationale de Bordeaux ) – Explosiv 13 February 2000
15 – Bordeaux, Prix BMW Accumulator (Prix BMW Accumulator ) – Explosiv 12 February 2000
15 – Bordeaux, Prix Equidia (Prix Equidia) – Sir Piroth 12 February 2000
17 – Bordeaux, Prix du Comite Des Expositions De Bordeaux (Prix du Comite Des Expositions De Bordeaux ) – Explosiv 11 February 2000
20 – Bordeaux, World Cup Preliminary Round (World Cup Preliminary Round) – ET 11 February 2000
07 – Amsterdam, World Cup Qualifier (World Cup Qualifier ) – ET 4 December 1999
15 – Frankfurt, Grand Prix (Grand Prix) – ET 12 October 1999
03 – Munchen-Riem, Germany, Grand Prix (Grand Prix) – Wahre Liebe 13 May 1999
06 – Berlin, Berlin Grand Prix (Berlin Grand Prix) – ET 23 November 1998
01 – Stuttgart, Germany, Stuttgart Grand Prix (Stuttgart Grand Prix) – ET 22 November 1998
01 – Neumunster Germany, Neumunster Grand Prix (Neumunster Grand Prix) – Apricot D 22 September 1998
06 – Aachen, Prize of Licher Privatbrauerei (Prize of Licher Privatbrauerei) – Especiale 15 August 1998
05 – Aachen, Prize of Tuchfabrik Becker (Prize of Tuchfabrik Becker) – ET 14 August 1998
09 – Aachen, Nordrhein-Westfalen-Preis (Nordrhein-Westfalen-Preis) – Apricot D 13 August 1998
01 – Aachen, Prize of EXPO (Prize of EXPO) – ET 12 August 1998
03 – Aachen, Prize of Aachener (Prize of Aachener) – Apricot D 11 August 1998
01 – Aachen, Prize of ELSA AG (Prize of ELSA AG) – ET 11 August 1998
01 – Aachen, Grand Prix (Grand Prix) – ET 24 July 1998
01 – Aachen, Preis von Europa (Preis von Europa) – ET 23 July 1998
01 – Geesteren, Netherlands, Grand Prix (Grand Prix) – ET 17 July 1998
02 – Dortmund Germany, Dortmund Grand Prix (Dortmund Grand Prix) – ET 10 March 1998
06 – Stuttgart, Germany, Mercedes Masters (Mercedes Masters ) – Apricot D 18 November 1997
02 – European championships., Individual (Individual) – ET 23 August 1997
09 – Aachen, Nations Cup (Nations Cup) – Apricot D 8 July 1997
01 – Hamburg, Germany, Hamburg Derby (Hamburg Derby) – Gondoso 3 June 1997
01 – World Cup Final, World Cup – 3rd Leg (World Cup – 3rd Leg) – ET 24 April 1997
01 – World Cup Final, World Cup – 2nd Leg (World Cup – 2nd Leg) – ET 24 April 1997
01 – World Cup Final, World Cup – 1st Leg (World Cup – 1st Leg) – ET 24 April 1997
01 – World Cup Final, World Cup Final (World Cup Final) – ET 21 April 1997
01 – Dortmund Germany, Dortmund Grand Prix (Dortmund Grand Prix) – ET 10 March 1997
01 – Berlin, Berlin Grand Prix (Berlin Grand Prix) – Apricot D 13 November 1996
01 – Monterry, Grand Prix (Grand Prix) – ET 17 August 1996
04 – Olympics, Individual (Individual) – ET 29 July 1996
14 -, Individual showjumping: First qualifying section (Individual showjumping: First qualifying section) – ET 27 July 1996
07 – Geesteren, Netherlands, Grand Prix (Grand Prix) – Magnum 5 July 1996
02 – Aachen, Grand Prix (Grand Prix) – ET 19 June 1996
06 – Aachen, Grand Prix (Grand Prix) – ET 17 June 1996
05 – Aachen, Preis von Europa (Preis von Europa) – ET 13 June 1996
10 – Aachen, Nations Cup (Nations Cup) – ET 11 June 1996
01 – World Cup Final, World Cup – 1st Leg (World Cup – 1st Leg) – ET 24 April 1996
01 – World Cup Final, World Cup Final (World Cup Final) – ET 21 April 1996
01 – Dortmund Germany, World Cup Qualifier (World Cup Qualifier) – ET 8 April 1996
04 – Zurich, Zurich Grand Prix (Zurich Grand Prix) – ET 25 March 1996
01 – s'Hertogenbosch, Netherlands, World Cup Qualifier (World Cup Qualifier) – Apricot D 18 March 1996
01 – Bologna, Gran Premio (Gran Premio) – ET 23 February 1996
04 – Bologna, World Cup Qualifier (World Cup Qualifier) – ET 23 February 1996
05 – Stuttgart, Germany, Stuttgart Grand Prix (Stuttgart Grand Prix) – Apricot D 14 November 1995
05 – Geesteren, Netherlands, Grand Prix (Grand Prix) – Apricot D 16 July 1995
01 – Hamburg, Germany, Hamburg Derby (Hamburg Derby) – ET 3 June 1995
02 – Dortmund Germany, Dortmund Grand Prix (Dortmund Grand Prix) – Apricot D 7 April 1995
07 – Zurich, Zurich Grand Prix (Zurich Grand Prix) – Apricot D 23 March 1995
12 – s'Hertogenbosch, Netherlands, World Cup Qualifier (World Cup Qualifier) – Apricot D 18 March 1995
10 – Geesteren, Netherlands, Grand Prix (Grand Prix) – Apricot D 12 June 1994
01 – Bruxelles, World Cup Qualifier (World Cup Qualifier) – Apricot D 5 April 1994
07 – Dortmund Germany, Dortmund Grand Prix (Dortmund Grand Prix) – Amaretto I 16 April 1993
01 – Aarhus, World Cup Qualifier (World Cup Qualifier) – Apricot D 2 April 1993
06 – Stuttgart, Germany, Mercedes Masters (Mercedes Masters ) – Apricot D 13 November 1992
24 – Olympics, Individual (Individual) – Apricot D 22 May 1992
01 – Antwerp, World Cup Qualifier (World Cup Qualifier) – Apricot D 13 October 1990
37 – Olympics, Individual (Individual) – Gipsy Lady 22 May 1988
01 – Dortmund Germany, World Cup Qualifier (World Cup Qualifier) – Winzer 8 April 1987
04 – Rotterdam, Netherlands, Nations Cup (Nations Cup) – The Freak 31 August 1986
06 – Donaueschingen, Germany, Nations Cup (Nations Cup) – The Freak 13 June 1986
01 – Berlin, Berlin Grand Prix (Berlin Grand Prix) – The Freak 14 November 1985
03 – Rotterdam, Netherlands, Nations Cup (Nations Cup) – The Freak 31 August 1985
01 – Göteborg Sweden, World Cup Qualifier (World Cup Qualifier) – The Freak 8 April 1985
03 – Dortmund Germany, World Cup Qualifier (World Cup Qualifier) – Gladstone 6 April 1985
07 – Bruxelles, World Cup Qualifier (World Cup Qualifier) – The Freak 23 June 1984
01 – Hamburg, Germany, Hamburg Derby (Hamburg Derby) – Gladstone 3 June 1984
22 – Olympics, Individual (Individual) – The Freak 22 May 1984
07 – Amsterdam, World Cup Qualifier (World Cup Qualifier ) – The Freak 24 April 1984
06 – Bordeaux, Grand Prix (Grand Prix) – The Freak 11 March 1984
01 – Hamburg, Germany, Hamburg Derby (Hamburg Derby) – Gladstone 3 June 1983
02 – World Cup Final, World Cup Final (World Cup Final) – Gladstone 24 April 1983
01 – Göteborg Sweden, World Cup Qualifier (World Cup Qualifier) – Gladstone 8 April 1983
03 – World Cup Final, World Cup Final (World Cup Final) – Gladstone 24 April 1982
03 – World Cup Final, World Cup Final (World Cup Final) – Gladstone 24 April 1981
01 – Göteborg Sweden, World Cup Qualifier (World Cup Qualifier) – Gladstone 8 April 1981
01 – World Cup Final, World Cup – 3rd Leg (World Cup – 3rd Leg) – Gladstone 24 April 1980
01 – s'Hertogenbosch, Netherlands, World Cup Qualifier (World Cup Qualifier) – Gladstone 18 March 1980
01 – Antwerp, World Cup Qualifier (World Cup Qualifier) – Answer 13 October 1979
01 – World Cup Final, World Cup – 1st Leg (World Cup – 1st Leg) – Gladstone 24 April 1979
01 – Göteborg Sweden, Göteborg Grand Prix (Göteborg Grand Prix) – Jasper 21 April 1979
01 – World Cup Final, World Cup Final (World Cup Final) – Gladstone 21 April 1979
01 – Dortmund Germany, World Cup Qualifier (World Cup Qualifier) – Gladstone 8 April 1979
01 – Amsterdam, World Cup Qualifier (World Cup Qualifier ) – Gladstone 16 December 1978
01 – Hamburg, Germany, Hamburg Derby (Hamburg Derby) – Jasper 3 June 1977
05 – Olympics, Individual (Individual) – Lavendel 22 May 1976
04 – Olympics, Individual (Individual) – Lavendel 22 May 1972

See also
 List of athletes with the most appearances at Olympic Games

References

External links

 Sports-Reference Profile

1942 births
Living people
Austrian show jumping riders
Olympic equestrians of Austria
Austrian male equestrians
Equestrians at the 1972 Summer Olympics
Equestrians at the 1976 Summer Olympics
Equestrians at the 1984 Summer Olympics
Equestrians at the 1988 Summer Olympics
Equestrians at the 1992 Summer Olympics
Equestrians at the 1996 Summer Olympics
Olympic silver medalists for Austria
People from Sudetenland
People from Šumperk District
Olympic medalists in equestrian
Medalists at the 1992 Summer Olympics
Recipients of the Decoration of Honour for Services to the Republic of Austria